The Casa Grande class was a class of dock landing ships  used by the Royal Navy and the United States Navy during the Second World War.

Design
The 'Landing Ship Dock' or LSD developed from a British staff requirement for a type of self-propelled drydock to transport beaching craft over long distances, that would in turn deliver trucks and supplies onto the beach. A flooding deck aft capable of holding either two of the larger British Landing craft tanks (LCTs) or three of the new US LCTs was included in the designs. With the option of fitting extra decks, large numbers of vehicles could be transported, and loaded into landing craft via ramps.

Service
The British initially ordered seven of the class from US dockyards, numbered LSD-9 to 15. Only four were delivered, numbers 9 to 12, while 13 to 15 were retained by the US Navy, which ordered another twelve to the design, but only built ten. In total thirteen of the ships served with the US Navy, while four ships served with the Royal Navy.

Ships

United States Navy

Royal Navy

Gallery

Notes

References

External links

Casa Grande class at Uboat.net
 "Mother of Minesweepers." Popular Mechanics, February 1952, pp. 97–104.

 

 
Ship classes of the Royal Navy
Ship classes of the French Navy